Lily Taylor may refer to:

 Lily Ross Taylor (1886–1969), American academic and author
 Lily Taylor (squash player) (born 1996), English squash player

See also
 Lili Taylor (born 1967), American actress